The 3rd AIBA European 2004 Olympic Qualifying Tournament was held in Gothenburg, Sweden from April 20 to April 25, 2004. The top two in each weight category gained qualification into the 2004 Summer Olympics.

Medal winners

Qualified

Flyweight (– 51 kg)

Featherweight (– 57 kg)

Light Welterweight (– 64 kg)

Middleweight (– 75 kg)

See also
2004 European Amateur Boxing Championships
1st AIBA European 2004 Olympic Qualifying Tournament
2nd AIBA European 2004 Olympic Qualifying Tournament
4th AIBA European 2004 Olympic Qualifying Tournament

References
amateur-boxing

European 3
2004 in Swedish sport